Sri Utaminingsih (born 19 October 1961) is an Indonesian former professional tennis player.

Utaminingsih played Federation Cup tennis for Indonesia in the 1980s, featuring in 11 ties. Her appearances include a tie against the United States in California, where she lost in the singles to Chris Evert. She won one singles and four doubles rubbers in her Federation Cup career.

A regular participant at the Southeast Asian Games, Utaminingsih won tennis gold medals in mixed doubles and team events. She was an Indonesian representative at the 1986 Asian Games in Seoul and won a bronze medal in the team competition, playing with Suzanna Anggarkusuma and Yayuk Basuki.

Utaminingsih was also a Southeast Asian Games medalist in the sport of squash.

From 2014 to 2017, Utaminingsih served as team captain of the Indonesia Fed Cup team.

References

External links
 
 
 

1961 births
Living people
Indonesian female tennis players
Female squash players
Tennis players at the 1986 Asian Games
Medalists at the 1986 Asian Games
Asian Games bronze medalists for Indonesia
Asian Games medalists in tennis
Southeast Asian Games medalists in squash
Southeast Asian Games medalists in tennis
Southeast Asian Games gold medalists for Indonesia
Southeast Asian Games silver medalists for Indonesia
Southeast Asian Games bronze medalists for Indonesia
Competitors at the 1981 Southeast Asian Games
Competitors at the 1983 Southeast Asian Games
Competitors at the 1985 Southeast Asian Games
Competitors at the 2001 Southeast Asian Games
20th-century Indonesian women